Japan competed in the 2010 Asian Beach Games in Muscat, Oman from December 8 to December 16, 2010. The delegation was bannered by 46 athletes. Japan send their representatives in five sports, including beach soccer, beach volleyball, beach handball, sailing, and triathlon.

The delegation collected two golds, a silver, and three bronze medals at the game. The medals came from only two sports, triathlon and sailing. In the men's individual triathlon, Yuichi Hosoda secured a gold medal before later Juri Ide also gained another gold in women's individual triathlon. Ryosuke Yamamoto finished third behind Hosoda and won the bronze medal. In other hand, Akane Tsuchihashi also finished three after Ide and got bronze medal. The sailing athletes, Megumi Iseda and Mai Mitsuishi finished 2nd and 3rd in women's Techno 293 event, so they came with silver and bronze medal.

Medallist

|  style="text-align:left; width:78%; vertical-align:top;"|

|  style="text-align:left; width:22%; vertical-align:top;"|

Competitors

Beach handball

Men's team
  Taiki Agarie
  Kentaro Kawaguchi
  Remi Anri Doi
  Yuki Maeda
  Ken Matsunaga
  Masanori Hasegawa
  Kosei Ogawa
  Daichi Komatsu
  Ken Matsumoto
  Akio Fujii

Women's team
  Tomoka Kinoshita
  Ayana Misawa
  Erina Kutsukake
  Rie Saiki
  Yumiko Takahashi
  Haruna Wakita
  Tomoko Sakamoto
  Saiki Masuda
  Chihiro Mochizuki
  Erina Yamanaka

Beach soccer

Men's team

  Shingo Terukina
  Hiroya Ginoza
  Takeshi Kawaharazuka
  Shinji Makino
  Teruki Tabata
  Masahito Toma
  Tomoya Uehara
  Naoki Otsubo
  Masayuki Komaki
  Takasuke Goto

Beach volleyball

Men's team

 1 Yoshiumi Hasegawa
 1 Hitoshi Murakami
 2 Keisuke Imai
 2 Yujiro Hidaka

Women's team

 1 Ayumi Kusano
 1 Miki Oyama
 2 Mutsumi Ozaki
 2 Angela Ishida

Sailing

Men's Techno 293
 Seiji Masubuchi
 Satoshi Sagae

Women's Techno 293
 Megumi Iseda 
 Mai Mitsuishi

Triathlon

Men's individual
 Yuichi Hosoda 
 Ryosuke Yamamoto

Women's individual
 Juri Ide 
 Akane Tsuchihashi

See also
 Japan at the Asian Games

References

Nations at the 2010 Asian Beach Games
2010 in Japanese sport